Chesney is an English surname or given name and a French surname It is derived from Old French chesnai ("oak grove"). The name first reached England following its conquest by the Normans in 1066, the modern French spelling of the common name is chênaie (pronounced the same way) "oak grove". Notable persons with the name include:

As a surname:
 Charles Cornwallis Chesney (1826–1876), British soldier and military writer
 Chester A. Chesney (1916–1986), American politician
 Dennis K. Chesney (active 1999–2000), American astronomer
 Francis Rawdon Chesney (1789–1872), British general and explorer
 Sir George Tomkyns Chesney (1830–1895), British general, politician, and author
 James Chesney (1934–1980), Irish priest and co-worker of IRA in Claudy bombing
 Kathleen Chesney (1899–1976), British scholar of medieval French literature
 Kenny Chesney (born 1968), American country music singer
 Marion Chesney (1936–2019), British novelist
 Maxine M. Chesney (born 1942), American judge
 Robert de Chesney (died 1166), Bishop of Lincoln
 Robert M. Chesney (born 1971), American law professor
 Ronald Chesney (born 1922), British TV comedy screenwriter in Chesney and Wolfe
 Stanley Chesney (1918–1978), American soccer goalkeeper
 William de Chesney (died after 1161), brother of Robert de Chesney and a nobleman
 William de Chesney (sheriff) (died 1174), medieval sheriff of multiple counties
 Sir Francis Chesney and his son Jack, characters in 1892 British farce Charley's Aunt

As a given name:
 Chesney Allen (1894–1982), British entertainer
 Chesney Hawkes (born 1971), British pop singer
 Chesney Battersby-Brown (active since 2003), character on Coronation Street
 Chesney Snow (born 1979), American stage actor, musician and beat-boxer
 Chet Baker (1929–1988), American musician, born Chesney Henry Baker Jr.

As a nickname:
 Wojciech Szczęsny (born 1990), Polish football goalkeeper, given because of his surname

References

See also
 Cheney (disambiguation)
 Chaney

Given names
French-language surnames
English-language surnames